Ourania Rebouli (born 16 May 1989 in Leros) is a Greek long-distance runner. She competed in the half marathon at the 2016 European Athletics Championships, finishing in the sixth place.

Competition record

References

External links

1989 births
Living people
Greek female long-distance runners
Greek female marathon runners
Place of birth missing (living people)
Athletes (track and field) at the 2016 Summer Olympics
Olympic athletes of Greece
Athletes (track and field) at the 2013 Mediterranean Games
Mediterranean Games competitors for Greece
Sportspeople from the South Aegean
People from Leros
21st-century Greek women